The 2008 All-Ireland Under-21 Football Championship was the 45th staging of the All-Ireland Under-21 Football Championship since its establishment by the Gaelic Athletic Association in 1964.

Cork entered the championship as defending champions, however, they were defeated by Kerry in the Munster semi-final.

On 3 May 2008, Kerry won the championship following a 2-12 to 0-11 defeat of Kildare in the All-Ireland final. This was their 10th All-Ireland title overall and their first in ten championship seasons.

Results

All-Ireland Under-21 Football Championship

Semi-finals

Final

Statistics

Miscellaneous

 Kildare and Down meet for the first time in the championship since 1965.

References

2008
All-Ireland Under-21 Football Championship